A fainting couch is a modern term describing a couch with a back that is traditionally raised at one end.  The back may be situated completely at one side of the couch or may wrap around and extend the entire length of the piece much like a traditional couch.  However, so-called "fainting couches" are easily differentiated from more traditional couches, having one end of the back raised.

The style of couch referred to popularly as "fainting couches" were popular in the 19th century as a revival of ancient furniture styles.

Popular speculation about the need for fainting couches
The term "fainting couch" is not documented as being in use until the 20th century. There is nothing to suggest in advertising of the Victorian era that any article of furniture was created specifically for people to use when feeling faint and this should only be considered a myth.
 Popular speculation explains the predominance of what are now called "fainting couches" in the 19th century as a result of women fainting because their corsets were too tight, restricting blood flow.  This does not have historic support; it has been proposed instead that these "day beds" (as they were referred to at the time) were in imitation of Roman and Grecian daybed designs.

See also
 Chaise longue

References

Further reading

External links 
 

 Couches